Edward Nasigrie Mahama (born 15 April 1945) is a Ghanaian medical doctor and politician.

Early life and education
Born in the village of Sumniboma (northern Ghana) in 1945, Mahama attended Nalerigu Primary and Middle School from 1953 to 1959. He then attended Secondary School in Tamale from 1961 to 1965. Later that year, he was admitted to the University of Ghana in Legon and graduated in 1972 with a medical degree.

Medicine
Mahama went back to Nalerigu as a medical doctor in September 1973 and four years later, he left Ghana to become an Obstetrics and Gynecology Physician in Chicago, Illinois. During this period, he was also a Clinical Instructor at Northwestern University. In 1990, Mahama was appointed a lecturer at the University of Ghana Medical School and consultant at Accra's Korle Bu Teaching Hospital. He was elected a fellow of the West African College of Surgeons in 1994.

Politics
In 1996, running as the presidential candidate of the People's National Convention (PNC), he received 3.0% of the vote. In his second attempt at the presidency, in 2000, he won 2.5% of the vote.

In preparation for the 2004 presidential election, the PNC and two other parties – Every Ghanaian Living Everywhere (EGLE) and the Great Consolidated Popular Party (GCPP) – formed an alliance known as the Grand Coalition and chose Mahama as its presidential candidate. He placed third out of four candidates, winning 1.9% of the vote.

Mahama was elected as the candidate for the PNC for the December 7, 2008 presidential elections.

Edward Mahama lost the position of presidential candidate of the PNC to Hassan Ayariga in the run up to the 2012 general election. However, he won the position back from Ayariga for the 2016 election. After the defeat, Ayariga left the PNC to form another party, the All People's Congress (APC).

Edward Mahama is currently Ghana's Ambassador-at-Large.

Family
Mahama is married and the father of four children.

References

1945 births
Ghanaian gynaecologists
Living people
University of Ghana alumni
Academic staff of the University of Ghana
People's National Convention (Ghana) politicians
Candidates for President of Ghana
Tamale Senior High School alumni